Kyle Marshall Pontifex (born 5 February 1980 in Wellington) is a New Zealand professional field hockey player. He plays as a goalkeeper. He earned his first cap for the New Zealand national team, nicknamed The Black Sticks, in 2001 against Malaysia.

Pontifex represented his country in three consecutive Summer Olympics: in 2004 (Athens), 2008 (Beijing) and 2012 (London). He was a batonbearer for the 2022 Commonwealth Games Queen's Baton Relay when the baton came to Basin Reserve in March 2022.

International senior tournaments
 2003 – Sultan Azlan Shah Cup
 2003 – Champions Challenge
 2004 – Olympic Qualifying Tournament
 2004 – Summer Olympics
 2004 – Champions Trophy
 2005 – Sultan Azlan Shah Cup
 2006 – Commonwealth Games
 2006 – World Cup
 2007 – Champions Challenge
 2008 – Olympic Games
 2012 – Olympic Games

References

External links
 

1980 births
Living people
New Zealand male field hockey players
Male field hockey goalkeepers
Olympic field hockey players of New Zealand
Field hockey players at the 2004 Summer Olympics
Field hockey players at the 2008 Summer Olympics
Field hockey players at the 2012 Summer Olympics
2006 Men's Hockey World Cup players
2010 Men's Hockey World Cup players
Commonwealth Games medallists in field hockey
Commonwealth Games bronze medallists for New Zealand
Field hockey players at the 2006 Commonwealth Games
Field hockey players at the 2010 Commonwealth Games
Field hockey players from Wellington City
Medallists at the 2010 Commonwealth Games